Addio (Italian Goodbye) may refer to:

Music
"Addio", song by Tosti
"L'Addio", song by Leoncavallo
"L'Addio", two different songs by Donizetti
"Addio, addio", Italian entry in the Eurovision Song Contest 1962, performed in Italian by Claudio Villa
"Addio", song by Ames Brothers	Al Hoffman, Dick Manning, 1954
"Addio", song by Claudio Villa, 1958
"Addio", song by Ann-Louise, 1963
"Addio", song by Demis Roussos, Leo Leandros, K. Munro, 1974
"Addio", song by Fred Bertelmann, Richards, Baker, Ross, Blecher, 1959
"Addio", song by Gino Paoli, 1971
"Addio", song by Kamahl, H. Van Hemert and R. Woddis, 1975
"Addio", song by Mina, Amurri, Morgan, 1965
"Addio", song by Will Tura, Jean Kluger, Fred Jay, Adapt. Nelly Byl, 1977
"Addio", song by Mireille Mathieu, 1975